The  is a kei car manufactured and marketed by Suzuki since 1993. The R in the name stands for Revolution and Relaxation. The Wagon R uses a "tall wagon" configuration  to maximize cabin space within kei car dimensional restrictions. The Wagon R is also sold by Mazda as the AZ-Wagon from 1994 to 2012 and as the Flair from 2012.

The Wagon R has been the best-selling kei car in Japan since 2003. In 2008, Suzuki produced its three-millionth Wagon R. Sales reached 5 million at the end of February 2010.



First generation (CT21S/CT51S/CV21S/CV51S; 1993)

The R used the same 660 cc F6A three-cylinder engines as did the Alto and other Suzuki kei cars. Originally with two doors on the left side and a single door on the right (driver's) side, it was introduced at the 1993 Tokyo Motor Show. In August 1996 the more common, symmetrical five-door setup became available and soon supplanted the earlier body style. For model year 1994, it won the Automotive Researchers' and Journalists' Conference Car of the Year award in Japan.

The rebadged Autozam AZ Wagon was presented in September 1994. Also using the F6A engine, this model was marketed through Mazda's Autozam network as part of an OEM deal. After April 1997, this was sold as the "Mazda AZ Wagon."

A bigger first generation Wagon R, the Suzuki Wagon R+, was added in early 1997 and manufactured in Japan until the end of 2000 for the European market. The car featured a wider body and the K10A naturally aspirated engine with 996 cc and four-cylinders. The same Wagon R+ was also available with a 1.2-litre K12A engine.

Second generation (MC21S/MC11S/MC22S/MC12S; 1998)

1998 saw the introduction of the second-generation Wagon R in Japan.

The larger (non-kei) Wagon R+ was replaced in 1999 - this was brought to Europe in 2000, with larger engines and was sold as the Suzuki Wagon R+. This larger version is also produced in Esztergom in Hungary by Magyar Suzuki and in Gurgaon, India by Maruti Suzuki. The Opel Agila is a badge engineered version of the Suzuki Wagon R-Wide, also introduced in summer 2000. This generation of Maruti Suzuki Wagon R in India was produced until 2010.

Third generation (MH21S/MH22S; 2003)

The third generation Wagon R was launched in Japan in September 2003 for the Wagon R's tenth Anniversary, but now only as a 660 cc K6A-engined kei car - no oversized version (like the previous Wide and + versions) was developed. The third generation was then facelifted in September 2005 and replaced three years later.

The Stingray, first seen in February 2007, is a sportier version of the third generation Suzuki Wagon R. The name is an homage to the "Sting Ray" Fronte introduced in 1970. In addition to a more aggressive front end treatment, the Stingray also received clear taillights. Alloy wheels and an aero kit were also standard. The 660 cc engine was powered by a turbocharger, further enhancing the speed and acceleration.

Fourth generation (MH23S; 2008)

The fourth generation Wagon R was launched in Japan in September 2008 along with the sportier Stingray, AZ-Wagon and AZ-Wagon Custom variant (the latter two manufactured for Mazda). Significant differences for the new generation include larger rear doors, which incorporate quarter glass, eliminating the need for a D-pillar arrangement. As with many other Japanese market models, customers can choose between front-wheel and all-wheel-drive versions.

Fifth generation (MH34S/MH44S; 2012)

The fifth generation Wagon R range was launched in Japan in September 2012 with an optional mild-hybrid system marketed as "ENE-CHARGE," and an energy-saving electric air conditioning system marketed as "ECO-COOL". With the R06A engine combined with an electric motor/generator and a lithium-ion battery, the ENE-CHARGE provides regenerative braking and power assist to the internal combustion engine and can also run certain electrical equipment, enabling mileage up to 28.8 km/L in Japan's JC08 driving cycle (67.8 mpg US, 3.5 L/100 km EU or 81.4 mpg UK).

For Mazda variants, the fifth generation Wagon R models are marketed as Mazda Flair and Stingray models are rebadged as Mazda Flair Custom Style. Both the Flair and the Flair Custom Style were launched in October 2012.

Sixth generation (MH35S/MH55S; 2017)

The sixth generation Wagon R range was launched in Japan on 1 February 2017. This iteration comes with an upgraded ISG (integrated starter generator) and increased capacity for the hybrid battery. Due to the improved battery and ISG, the Wagon R is capable of driving alone on its hybrid battery up to 10 seconds if the speed is kept under .

The facelifted regular model was unveiled on 2 August 2022, along with the introduction of Custom Z model.

Wagon R Smile (MX81S/MX91S; 2021)

The Wagon R Smile was announced on 27 August 2021 as a retro-styled kei car with sliding doors adopting the Wagon R nameplate.

References

External links
 
  (Mazda Flair)

Wagon R
City cars
Kei cars
2000s cars
2010s cars
2020s cars
Cars introduced in 1993
Vehicles with CVT transmission